The  1961 Dallas Texans season was the 2nd season for the Dallas Texans as a professional AFL franchise; They finished the season with a 6–8 record and second-place finish in the AFL Western Conference.

The club moved its training camp to Lamar Hunt's alma mater of Southern Methodist University and started the regular season at 3–1 before hitting a six-game losing skid, the longest such streak of head coach Hank Stram's tenure with the franchise. One of those losses was a 28–21 decision in a Friday night contest at Boston (11/3) which featured a bizarre ending as a raincoat-clad fan knocked down a potential game-tying TD from Cotton Davidson to Chris Burford on the game's final play. The team rebounded to claim wins in three of its final four contests to finish 6–8, marking the club's second straight finish behind the Chargers in the AFL West standings.

Draft

Regular season

Schedule

Standings

References

External links 
 1961 Dallas Texans season on Database Football

1961 Dallas Texans season
Dallas Texans
1961 in sports in Texas